Josh Friedman (born 14 February 1967) is an American screenwriter and television producer. He is best known for his work on the science-fiction action genre, including on the series Terminator: The Sarah Connor Chronicles, the film adaptation of H. G. Wells' War of the Worlds (2005), Terminator: Dark Fate (2019), and James Cameron's Avatar: The Way of Water. He also wrote the neo-noir murder mystery The Black Dahlia (2006).

Friedman has developed several television pilots, including the TNT series Snowpiercer, based on Bong Joon-ho's film of the same name. Friedman departed the program in January 2018 due to creative differences with the network, and he was replaced by Graeme Manson. Friedman later claimed that he felt pressured to leave by TNT due to a "radical difference in vision", with an implicit threat of blacklisting should he fail to comply. Following his departure, several cast and crew members announced their departure likewise in solidarity with Friedman. He is currently attached to Foundation, based on Isaac Asimov's Foundation series.

Friedman is Jewish.

Filmography

Film

Television

References

External links
 
 Josh Friedman's Blog: I Find Your Lack of Faith Disturbing
 Interview with Chud.com
 Interview with The Scifi World

1967 births
Living people
Skydance Media people
American male screenwriters
American male bloggers
American bloggers
Jewish American screenwriters
Brown University alumni
21st-century American screenwriters
21st-century American Jews